Klintsy is a town in Bryansk Oblast, Russia,located on the Turosna River,  southwest of Bryansk. Population:     60,000 (1972).

Administrative and municipal status
Within the framework of administrative divisions, Klintsy serves as the administrative center of Klintsovsky District, even though it is not a part of it. As an administrative division, it is, together with two rural localities, incorporated separately as Klintsovsky Urban Administrative Okrug—an administrative unit with the status equal to that of the districts. As a municipal division, Klintsovsky Urban Administrative Okrug is incorporated as Klintsy Urban Okrug.

History
Klintsy Sloboda was founded in 1707 by peasants-Old Believers, and is named after the last names of the first settlers (Klinets) in the plural.

In 1782 Klintsy was founded in a part of Surazh district. There were companies printing predominantly Old Believers liturgical books. The development of the printing industry contributed to higher literacy Klintsov population.

In 1782–1796 was Klintsy part of the Novgorod-Seversky governorship, and in 1796–1802 part of the Little Russia province. On February 27, 1802 posad Klintsy became part of Chernigov province, Surazh district.

Since the 1830s textile industries were developed  which gradually became the most important industry of the city. By the end of the 19th century there was concentrated more than 90% of the textile industry of Chernigov. The city became known as the "Manchester of Chernigov province".

In 1918 in accordance with Treaty of Brest-Litovsk the city was a part of the Ukrainian People's Republic, Chernigov province, Surazh district. On July 11, 1919, as part of the Gomel province of the RSFSR, Surazh district. Since 1921 Klintsy became a district center in a part of the Gomel Voblast.

On 19 October 1937 the city of Klintsy became part of Oryol Oblast, and since July 5, 1944 is  part of the Bryansk Oblast.

During World War II the city was occupied by German troops August 20, 1941 to September 25, 1943. Consequently, the Jewish population, which constituted about one-fifth of the population at the start of the 20th century, was massacred. More than 3000 Jews were murdered by a mobile squad of Einsatzgruppen in the outskirts of the village.

The city was moderately affected by fallout from the Chernobyl accident in 1986.

Culture
A famous native of Klintsy is Evgeny Belyaev (1926–1994) of the Alexandrov Ensemble.  A children's music school in Klintsy is named after him, and a bust of him has been placed in the town. It is also the birthplace of the artist Jacob Kramer, who later emigrated to England to escape anti-semitic persecution.

Twin towns and sister cities

Klintsy is twinned with:
 Kyustendil, Bulgaria

References

Notes

Sources

External links
 The murder of the Jews of Klintsy during World War II, at Yad Vashem website.

Cities and towns in Bryansk Oblast
Surazhsky Uyezd
Holocaust locations in Russia